Kader Attia (born 30 December 1970) is an Algerian-French artist.

Early life
Attia was born in Dugny, France to Algerian parents and was raised in Paris and Algeria. He studied at the l'école Duperré de Paris, l'école des arts appliqués La Massana de Barcelone and graduated from the Ecole nationale superieure des arts decoratifs Paris, in 1998.

Work
His work often examines social injustice, marginalized communities and postcolonialism.

In 2016, he founded La Colonie, a gallery near Paris' Gare du Nord train station. In March 2020, La Colonie closed permanently due to the coronavirus pandemic. In March 2021, Attia was announced as the curator for the 12th Berlin Biennale. He is the first artist to curate the biennale since New-York based collective DIS, who presented the 9th edition in 2016. In November 2021, he had an exhibition entitled "On Silence" at the Mathaf: Arab Museum of Modern Art in Doha.

Collections
Attia's work is included in the permanent collections of:
 the Museum of Modern Art, New York, 
 the Sharjah Art Foundation,
the Tate Museum,
 the Centre Georges Pompidou, Paris,
 the Institute of Contemporary Art, Boston, and
 the Guggenheim Museum in New York.

Awards
In 2016, he won France's Prix Marcel Duchamp. In 2018, he was awarded the Joan Miró Prize.

Notes

References

External links

1970 births
21st-century French male artists
Artists from Paris
Living people
Algerian artists
Algerian contemporary artists
French people of Algerian descent
Decolonial artists